The Boston Red Sox Radio Network is an American radio network composed of 54 radio stations which carry English language coverage of the Boston Red Sox, a professional baseball team in Major League Baseball (MLB). Lawrence, Massachusetts station WEEI-FM (93.7 FM), which serves Boston and the Greater Boston area, serves as the network's Flagship. The network also includes 49 affiliates in the U.S. states of Massachusetts, Maine, Connecticut, Rhode Island, Vermont, New Hampshire, New York, and Florida: 28 AM stations, 24 of which supplement their signals with one or more FM translators; and 21 full-power FM stations, one of which supplements its signal with several FM translators. Joe Castiglione currently serves as the network's play-by-play announcer; since the start of the 2020 Red Sox season, (Will Flemming, Sean McDonough, Jon Sciambi, Dave O'Brien, Dale Arnold and Tom Caron have alternated with Castiglione providing color commentary.  In addition to traditional over-the-air AM and FM broadcasts, network programming airs on SiriusXM satellite radio; and streams online via SiriusXM Internet Radio, TuneIn Premium, and MLB.com Gameday Audio.

Shaw's and Star Market Supermarkets, a grocery store chain which serves much of New England, holds naming rights to the "WEEI Shaw's and Star Market Red Sox Radio Network," rebranded in 2022 as the "WEEI Shaw's and Star Market Red Sox Network."

Programming
Play-by-play announcer Joe Castiglione, in addition to a rotation of co-hosts (Will Flemming, Sean McDonough, Jon Sciambi, Dave O'Brien, Dale Arnold or Tom Caron as the second play-by-play announcer, with Lou Merloni or Rob Bradford as color commentators for select games), calls games on-site. WEEI-FM personality Mike Mutnansky serves as pre- and post-game host. All regular season and many spring training games are broadcast.

Station list

Blue background indicates FM translator.

Network maps

Additional affiliates
1400 WHTB: Fall River (if there is a conflict on WSAR)
1240 WOON: Woonsocket (if there is a conflict on WVEI-FM)

Spanish Beisbol Network
In addition to the English-language network, the Boston Red Sox Spanish Beisbol Network is a one-station network carrying Spanish-language coverage of the Red Sox. Haverhill station WCCM (1490 AM) serves as the network's flagship; WCCM also simulcasts over an FM translator. Nilson Pepen currently serves as this network's play-by-play announcer.

Blue background indicates FM translator.

History

Former announcers

Former flagships
680 WRKO: Boston (1989-1994, (with WROR, 1989–90); 2007-August 25, 2009 (co-flagship with WEEI))
850 WHDH: Boston (1946-1975)
850 WEEI: Boston (1995-2012; weekday afternoon and occasional night games only from 2007-August 2009)
950 WROL: Boston (Spanish)
1390 WPLM: Plymouth, Massachusetts (1983–89)
1510 WMEX/WITS: Boston (1975-1982)
99.1 WPLM-FM: Plymouth, Massachusetts (1983–89)

Former affiliates
560 WCKL: Hudson, New York
560 WHYN: Springfield, Massachusetts (through 2006)
580 WTAG: Worcester, Massachusetts (circa 1967-2006)
610 WGIR: Manchester, N.H. (1997)
620 WZON: Bangor, Maine (1994–2017)
630 WPRO: Providence, R.I. (1986-2005)
730 WJTO: Bath, Me. (1997)
930 CFBC: Saint John, New Brunswick (1997)
930 WIZR: Johnstown, New York (-2012) (was an affiliate in 1997)
940 WGFP: Webster, Massachusetts (2005)
940 WINE: Danbury (1997)
960 WSVU: North Palm Beach, Florida (20??-2012)
970 WESO: Southbridge, Massachusetts (1997)
990 WALE: Greenville, R.I. (2005, 2008)
990 WCMF: Rochester, N.Y. (1997)
1010 WCNL: Newport, New Hampshire (????-2012)
1110 WHIM: East Providence, R.I. (unknown date)
1110 WCCM: Salem, New Hampshire
1120 WPRX: Bristol, Connecticut (2005)
1160 WSKW: Skowhegan, Maine (????-2005)
1200 WTLA: Syracuse, N.Y. (2010–2011)
1220 WQUN: Hamden, Connecticut (????-2012)
1220 WRIB: Providence, R.I.
1230 WERI: Westerly, R.I. (1997)
1230 WJOY: Burlington, Vermont (????-2012)
1230 WNEB: Worcester
1240 WHMQ: Greenfield, Massachusetts (-2012)
1270 WTSN: Dover, New Hampshire (1997)
1280 WFAU: Gardiner, Maine (????-2012)
1350 WNLK: Norwalk, Connecticut (1997)
1380 WNRI: Woonsocket, R.I. (1997)
1390 WEGP: Presque Isle, Maine
1400 WVAE: Biddeford, Maine (????-2006)
1400 WHMP: Northampton, Massachusetts (????-2012)
1400 WLTN: Littleton, New Hampshire (????-2012)
1400 WSTC: Stamford, Connecticut (1997)
1420 WASR: Wolfeboro, New Hampshire (????-2012)
1420 WBSM: New Bedford, Massachusetts (until 2022)
1420 WRSA: St. Albans, Vermont (-2012)
1440 WRED: Westbrook, Maine (????-2012)
1440 WSGO: Oswego, N.Y. (2010–2011)
1450 WKXL: Concord, New Hampshire (1997)
1450 WKRI: West Warwick, R.I. (1997)
1450 WTSA: Brattleboro, Vermont (late 1960s-early 1970s?)
1470 WSRO: Marlborough, Massachusetts (1997)
1480 WCFR: Springfield, Vermont (also W293BH)
1490 WFAD: Middlebury, Vermont (????-2012)
1490 WUVR: Lebanon, New Hampshire (????-2012)
1570 WPEP: Taunton, Massachusetts (2004-2005)
1600 WHNP: East Longmeadow, Massachusetts (????-2012)
92.7 WOXO-FM: Norway, Maine (1997)
93.5 WCFR-FM: Springfield, Vermont (1997)
94.9 WSYY-FM: Millinocket, Me. (1997-2015)
95.1 WXTK: West Yarmouth, Massachusetts (-2012)
95.5 WBRU: Providence, R.I. (2008 overflow)
96.7 WCME: Boothbay Harbor, Maine (Until 2006)
96.7 WQSO: Rochester, New Hampshire (????-2015)
98.3 WHAI-FM: Greenfield, Massachusetts
99.3 WWCN: Fort Myers, Florida (2019; format is now Spanish)
100.1 WPNH-FM: Plymouth, N.H. (1997)
100.7 WTBM: Mexico, Maine (1997)
101.1 WWKJ: Mashpee, Massachusetts (1998)
101.5 WWLK-FM: Meridith, New Hampshire (2019)
101.9 WCIB: Falmouth, Massachusetts (overflow station for WXTK until 2012)
101.9 WOZI: Presque Isle, Maine (2019)
102.5 WQSS: Camden, Maine (1990s-Early 2000s)
103.1 WZON-FM: Dover-Foxcroft, Maine (????-2011)
104.7 WQEZ: Kennebunkport, Maine (1997)
104.9 WBOQ: Gloucester, Massachusetts (2006–2017)
104.9 WSRD: Altamont, New York
105.5 WAXB: Paterson, New York (1997)

See also
List of XM Satellite Radio channels
List of Sirius Satellite Radio stations
List of Boston Red Sox broadcasters

References

External links
WEEI's list of Red Sox Radio Network affiliates

Boston Red Sox
Major League Baseball on the radio
Sports radio networks in the United States